The canton of Guerlédan (before 2021: Mûr-de-Bretagne) is an administrative division of the Côtes-d'Armor department, northwestern France. Its borders were modified at the French canton reorganisation which came into effect in March 2015. Its seat is in Guerlédan.

It consists of the following communes:
 
 Allineuc
 Caurel
 Corlay
 Gausson
 Grâce-Uzel
 Guerlédan
 Le Haut-Corlay
 Hémonstoir
 Merléac
 La Motte
 Plouguenast-Langast
 Plussulien
 Le Quillio
 Saint-Caradec
 Saint-Connec
 Saint-Gilles-Vieux-Marché
 Saint-Hervé
 Saint-Martin-des-Prés
 Saint-Mayeux
 Saint-Thélo
 Trévé
 Uzel

References

Cantons of Côtes-d'Armor